Bojana Janković (born May 7, 1983) is a former Serbian professional basketball player. She is currently the sports director in ŽKK Partizan. With ŽKK Partizan she won 3 national Championships (2009–10, 2010–11, 2011–12), national cup (2010–11) and Adriatic League Women (2011–12).

Personal life
She met her husband Michael Weatherly in 2010.

Professional career

Honours
ŽKK Partizan 
 National Championship of Serbia (3): 2009–10, 2010–11, 2011–12
 National Cup of Serbia (1): 2010–11
 Adriatic League Women (1): 2011–12

References

External links
 Profile at eurobasket.com

1983 births
Living people
Basketball players from Belgrade
Serbian women's basketball players
Power forwards (basketball)
ŽKK Partizan players
ŽKK Vršac players